The True Buddha School  is a relatively new (Vajrayana oriented) Buddhist sect, that includes practices and deities from Taoism, and thus could arguably be defined as a new religious movement. Its headquarters are in Redmond, WA, USA, and the school has a large following in Taiwan and East Asia. There are also many temples and chapters worldwide, except in Mainland China where the sect is among those persecuted.

In 1975, Lu Sheng-yen (盧勝彥) established Ling Xian Zong (School of Efficacious Immortals) in Taiwan, a name with strong Taoist connotations. He officially changed its name to True Buddha School on March 1, 1983. Lu is said to be a fully enlightened buddha, known by his disciples as "Living Buddha Lian-sheng" (蓮生活佛) and Grandmaster Lu. Huófó (活佛), which literally means "living buddha", is the Chinese equivalent to tulku, a Tibetan term for a reincarnated teacher or deity.  He is also referred to as the Root Guru by his disciples. Lu is a prolific author who has written 282 books [as of March 2021]. As of Feb 2013, the organization claims over 5,000,000 have taken refuge through him, although only a minority have become active students of the school and attendees at one of its temples.

Teachings 
According to the True Buddha School Introductory Handbook, Grandmaster Lu has “condensed the teachings into a series of simple, concise, and yet effective practices specifically tailored to meet the pace of a modern society.” Members of the True Buddha School emphasize the necessity to cultivate diligently for the benefit of spiritual advancement, as is the general practice of Vajrayana Buddhism. Empowerments are required for refuge practices, which may be received either directly from Grandmaster Lu or accredited Acharyas (Masters). Lu has lineages from all four major schools of Tibetan Buddhism, as well as Chinese Buddhism (both Vajrayana and Sutrayana) Japanese Shingon Buddhism, and Taoism. In addition, Lu claims direct lineage from Buddhas and Bodhisattvas (through meditation), and to be an emanation of 'Padmakumara', from the Pure Lands, who is in turn an emanation from Vairocana Buddha.

A Tantric Buddhist practitioner does not rely solely on 'external practices' of listening or reading spiritual doctrines, or simply worshiping and paying respect to Buddhas and Bodhisattvas as the method to achieve the goal of spiritual liberation. All students are expected to follow the fourteen Root Tantric Vows (known as Vajrayana samaya) along with the Five Precepts that all Buddhists should follow, and to respect the Root Guru.

There is a structured curriculum to guide the student's practice, and at each level, a specific yoga is practiced. To advance to the next level, the student must achieve yogic response from the yoga being practiced in the current level and receive empowerment for the yoga of the next level.

As a beginner, there are specific yogas that are practiced to establish a strong foundation. The yoga practiced in the first stage is Vajrasattva yoga, a great repentance yoga to purify bad karma. The next level is Guru Yoga, followed by Personal Deity yoga and then the inner body practices of energy yoga.

True Buddha School disseminates Buddhist teachings through Lu's sermons, books and articles. These materials are supplemented with sermons and articles by other acharyas (other gurus) certified by the grand master. Lu's books are mainly published in Chinese, with a limited number currently being translated into English. However, more translations are slowly being made to reach a wider audience. Many of the major True Buddha School sadhanas (liturgies) and practices are available in English.

Lineage 

Grandmaster Lu has lineage from the four major schools of Tibetan Buddhism, and well as the Shingon school of Japanese Vajrayana Buddhism, as follows:

Nyingma: Reverend Liao Ming 清真 (d.1971). He was a highly accomplished Taoist master who became a student of Nyingma guru Lama Norlha Rinpoche (1865–1936). His mastery of both Buddhist and Taoist teachings was very influential in the development of the True Buddha School.

According to the True Buddha School Introductory Handbook, Lu was also directly taught the eighteen volumes of the Great Perfection by Guru Padmasambhava who appeared to him in a vision.

Kagyu: The 16th Gyalwa Karmapa Rangjung Rigpe Dorje (1924 -1981), from whom he received highest empowerment of the "Five-Buddha Dignified Crown". The Karmapa gave him several lineage emblems including white crystal mala beads used by the Karmapa himself, a treasure vase from Rumtek Monastery in Sikkim, and other precious objects.

Sakya: Dezhung Rinpoche - referred to in Chinese as Master Shakya Zhengkong. He was the second highest guru in all of the Sakya lineage, and one of the first Tibetan lamas to settle and teach in the United States. He lived in Green Lake, Seattle, one of the principal temples of the Sakya tradition.  He also founded centres in New York, Minneapolis, Boston, and Los Angeles.

Gelug: Li Tingguang 李廷光, more commonly known as Vajra Acharya Thubten Dargye (1931-2006), a Chinese Tantric master who also had a Tibetan name. He was the disciple of Thubten Nima, who was the highest master of the Mongolian Gelug tradition. Thubten Nima had studied under the reputable Mongolian Sweet Dew (Ganzhu VII) (1914–1978) of the Gelug tradition. Thubten Dargye also studied under venerable Dudjom Rinpoche (1904–1987) of the Nyingma school, a Tibetan monk living in Nepal who established centres both in New York and Paris. True Buddha School's Kalachakra and Mahamudra lineages come via Thubten Dargye. Grandmaster Lu was also given emblems belonging to the 17th Kanjurwa Khutughtu, including two clay statues of Vajrapani and Vajravarahi, and a golden Kalachakra statue.

Shingon: Ven. Pufang 普方, a Chinese master of the Shingon tradition, who was the head of the Zhong Chi ("All Inclusive") temple in Taipei, and from whom Lu received the Cundi empowerment.

Over the years Lu has met with several eminent Tibetan Buddhists, including the Dalai Lama and the 100th Ganden Tripa in Dharamsala on Nov 12, 1996.

Worldwide chapters 
True Buddha School has chapters across North America, Europe, Asia, Australia, and Latin America, though the size of each local chapter varies. The main temple, known as the Ling Shen Ching Tze Temple  is located in Redmond, Washington. It also served as the main residence where Lu resided while he was living in United States. He lived in Tahiti with his wife Lian Hsiang in solitude for six years before re-emerging in the US in 2006, returning to his home in Redmond.

The majority of the followers of the True Buddha School are located in Asia, and many devotees are from Indonesia, Malaysia, Singapore, and Taiwan. Across North America, Australia, and Europe, the majority of the students are immigrants of Asian descent.

True Buddha School's funding relies heavily on donations, although no price is set for any ceremonies or services rendered. This is supplemented with the income from the publication of Lu's books and videos of his sermons. The money is used to publish its teaching materials and for charity work such as the South Asian tsunami relief effort.

Controversy

In 1995 the True Buddha School was banned by the Chinese authorities, who labelled it as a "cult organization".

Lu and the Ling Shen Ching Tze Temple Seattle were sued unsuccessfully in civil court by a former Malaysian immigrant disciple over an allegation of sexual misconduct whilst living in the temple dormitories. The King County, Washington prosecutor declined to file charges for lack of evidence. The case was dismissed by King County Superior Court Judge Kathleen Learned citing constitutional issues. In the case S.H.C. v. Sheng-Yen Lu, the Court of Appeals of Washington, Division 1, granted the Temple's motion for summary judgment, and the Court of Appeals later "affirm[ed] the order granting summary judgment of dismissal to the Temple."

Of the incident, Lu said:
"That woman student was very good at distorting the truth. She could twist ideas in a way that was hard to take. My earlier statement about withdrawing my foot after a close call was a reference to this student. I did not go to her bedroom, but I clearly recall that it was she who came (in her nightgown and unannounced) to my bedroom.

Well, the amazing thing was that I was completely in control of my elements and did not fall into her trap. I listened to her stories and, when she finished, I saw her out the door. That was all that happened. My clothes were tidily in order without a single button undone.

One comes across such things in life. This is why, when Buddha Shakyamuni was alive, defamatory stories were in wide circulation. There were incidents where various women made false accusations against the Buddha. Why? They found monks and spiritual cultivators to be easy targets. This is also why "refraining from sexual misconduct" is included in the Five Precepts."

Notes

References
Casey, Noah. The True Buddha School: A Field Research Report on The Chan Hai Lei Zang Temple. Montreal Religious Sites Project.
 Lu, Master Sheng-yen (1995). A Complete and Detailed Exposition on the True Buddha Tantric Dharma. San Bruno, CA: Purple Lotus Society.

External links
True Buddha School Official website in English and Chinese. Includes texts of practices and further information about the school.
TBBoyeh - free repository of all of Grandmaster Sheng-Yen Lu's books, in English and Chinese.
TBSseattle YouTube - live broadcasts and videos of the weekly ceremonies.
Ling Shen Ching Tze Temple Seattle - the main temple of TBS, in Redmond, WA, USA.
Rainbow Temple - venue for larger ceremonies in North Bend, WA, USA.
True Buddha School World Wide Chapters
Padmakumara – The Buddhist Teachings of Living Buddha Lian-sheng

Buddhist new religious movements
Schools of Buddhism founded in Taiwan
Redmond, Washington
Chinese cults